Martínez-Holguín House is a historic house museum in Atocha parish, in the northern suburbs of Ambato, Ambato Canton,  Tungurahua Province, Ecuador. It is situated in the Botanical Garden Atocha-La Liria, and dates to 1865, when it was built by Dr. Nicolás Martínez Vasconez. Since then, it has been the residence of several notable figures, including Luis A. Martínez, the author of the novel A la Costa and Minister of State and Education, who established the Colegio Normal de Agricultura in Ambato, and scientist Augusto Nicolás Martínez. It has since been converted into a wax museum.

Gallery

References

Museums in Ecuador
Wax museums
Buildings and structures in Tungurahua Province
Houses completed in 1865
1860s establishments in Ecuador
Ambato, Ecuador